= Como Zoo (Italy) =

Zoo in Como, Lombardy, Italy

- Type: Zoo
- Location: Como, Italy
- Area: Viale Felice Cavallotti, 20
- Created: 1937
- Status: Closed in 1988

Como Zoo was a Zoo in Como, Lombardy, northern Italy, created in 1937 and closed in 1988.
